Franco Nicolás Escobar (born 21 February 1995) is an Argentine professional footballer who plays as a right-back for Major League Soccer club Houston Dynamo.

Club career

Newell's Old Boys 
Escobar began his career in the Newell's Old Boys academy.  He made his first team debut on 7 June 2015, getting the start against Boca Juniors in a 4–0 loss.  He made 15 appearances during his debut season as Newell's finished 16th in the table.  Escobar made 6 appearances during the 2016 season and 12 in the 2016–17 season, playing as both a rightback and a centerback.  He made 2 appearance during the 2017–18 season prior to being sold.

Atlanta United 
On 8 December 2017 Escobar signed with MLS side Atlanta United.  On 3 March 2018 he made his debut for Atlanta, playing 90 minutes in a 4–0 loss to the Houston Dynamo in the opening match of the season. He suffered a concussion on 17 March in a 4–1 win over the Vancouver Whitecaps that would keep him out for the next 4 games.  On 5 May, late in a 2–1 against the Chicago Fire, Escobar collided with Atlanta goalkeeper Brad Guzan and injured his chest.  Escobar would miss the next 3 matches.  He scored his first goal for Atlanta on 21 October, helping Atanta to a 2–1 win over Chicago.  Escobar finished the regular season with 22 appearances and 1 goal as Atlanta finished 2nd in the Eastern Conference.  During Atlanta's playoff run, Escobar played every minute of the 5 games, scored 2 goals, and had an assist, including one in the final where Atlanta beat the Portland Timbers 2–0.  He was named to the MLS Cup Playoffs Best XI.

On 16 January 2019, on the first day of preseason, Escobar suffered a fractured right clavicle.  The injury forced him to miss all of Atlanta's CONCACAF Champions League matches as well as the first 3 games of the MLS season.  After making an appearance for Atlanta United 2 to regain fitness, he made his first MLS match of the season in a 2–0 loss to the Columbus Crew on 30 March.  Escobar ended the regular season with 1 goal and 3 assists in 25 appearances, helping Atlanta finish 2nd in the East.  In the opening round of the playoffs, Escobar scored the lone goal to give Atlanta a 1–0 win over the New England Revolution.  He played every minute of Atlanta's 3 playoff games, with the run ending in the Conference Finals following a 2–0 loss to Toronto FC.  In the 2019 Campeones Cup, Atlanta beat Club América 3–2, but Escobar was forced out of the game due to injury.

In a shortened 2020 season due to the COVID-19 Pandemic, Escobar played in 16 of the 23 matches and had 2 assists.  Atlanta finished the season 12th in the conference, missing the playoffs for the first time in team history.  In CCL play, Escobar made 3 appearances as Atlanta fell to Club América in the quarterfinals 3–1 on aggregate.

Loan to Newell's Old Boys 
On 9 February 2021, Escobar returned to Newell's Old Boys on a loan deal until 1 January 2022.  On 16 February, Escobar broke his foot (fifth metatarsal) in training.  He made his first appearance of the loan on 17 July, playing 58 minutes in a 3–2 win over Talleres de Córdoba.  In Newell's next match, Escobar had to be subbed off due to pain in his foot.  He would miss the next 18 matches.  He recovered from his injury to play in the final 5 games the year, ending the season with 7 appearances.

Los Angeles FC 
On 12 December 2021, Atlanta traded Escobar to Los Angeles FC in exchange for $600,000 in General Allocation Money.  He made his LAFC debut on 26 February, playing the full match in a 3–0 win over the Colorado Rapids in the opening game of the season.  On 6 March, LAFC drew 1–1 with the Portland Timbers, Escobar was forced off 13 minutes into the game with a calf injury that would keep him out for 6 games.  He scored his first goal for LAFC on 7 May, his second game back from the injury, to give LAFC a 2–2 draw with the Philadelphia Union.  Escobar missed another 4 MLS games plus an Open Cup game in May due to his calf.  He also missed 3 games due to a concussion at the end of the season.  Escobar ended the season with 1 goal and 1 assist in 19 regular season appearances, helping LAFC win the Supporters' Shield.  He made just one appearance in the playoffs, coming on as a late sub in a 3–0 win over Austin FC in the Conference Finals.  LAFC would go onto win MLS Cup 2022 3–0 on penalties against Philadelphia.

Escobar's contract expired following the 2022 season.

Houston Dynamo 
On 12 January 2023, Escobar signed with the Houston Dynamo.

Career statistics

Club

Honours
Atlanta United
MLS Cup: 2018
U.S. Open Cup: 2019
Campeones Cup: 2019

Los Angeles FC
Supporters' Shield: 2022
MLS Cup: 2022

Personal life 
Escobar obtained a green card in 2020, classifying him as a domestic player for MLS roster purposes.

References

External links
 

1995 births
Living people
Footballers from Rosario, Santa Fe
Argentine footballers
Argentine expatriate footballers
Argentine Primera División players
Major League Soccer players
Newell's Old Boys footballers
Atlanta United FC players
Los Angeles FC players
Houston Dynamo FC players
Expatriate soccer players in the United States
Association football defenders
USL Championship players
Argentine expatriate sportspeople in the United States
Atlanta United 2 players